Blues for Jimi is a live album and video by the Northern Irish, blues rock guitarist and singer, Gary Moore. The live performance was originally recorded on 25 October 2007 at the London Hippodrome.

The performance features Gary Moore playing a selection of Jimi Hendrix classics. The concert was part of the launch for the Jimi Hendrix Live at Monterey album. It features a special guest appearance by Billy Cox and Mitch Mitchell

Track listing

Personnel
 Gary Moore - Lead Vocals, lead and rhythm guitar
 Dave Bronze - Bass guitar (Tracks 1–8, 12)
 Darrin Mooney - Drums (Tracks 1–8, 12)
Special Guests
 Billy Cox - Bass guitar and vocals (Tracks 9–11)
 Mitch Mitchell - Drums (Tracks 9–11)

References

2012 live albums
Gary Moore live albums
Jimi Hendrix tribute albums
Eagle Records live albums